Beth Cunningham may refer to:
Beth A. Cunningham, American physicist
Beth Cunningham (basketball) (born 1975), American basketball player and coach